The ZCMI Center Mall was a shopping center near Temple Square in Salt Lake City, Utah, United States that was owned by Zions Securities Corporation (now Utah Property Management Associates), which opened in 1975 and closed in 2007. At the time of its opening, it was the largest downtown mall in the country. ZCMI stands for Zion's Co-operative Mercantile Institution, which refers to a department store owned by the Church of Jesus Christ of Latter-day Saints (LDS Church) that had locations in Utah and Idaho until it was sold to The May Department Stores Company. The ZCMI Center Mall, along with the affiliated Crossroads Plaza Mall, once constituted the largest shopping area in Salt Lake City.

On October 3, 2006, the LDS Church announced redevelopment plans for the ZCMI Center and Crossroads Plaza malls, as part of a $1 billion redevelopment plan known as the City Creek Center. The plan called for the demolition of the ZCMI Center Mall and the Crossroads Plaza Mall by the end of summer 2008.

Demolition of the entire project area started in November 2006, beginning with the Inn at Temple Square and the Crossroads Plaza Mall. The replacement City Creek Center opened in 2012.

One of the features of the ZCMI Center was a large glass chandelier that hung in the former ZCMI store. The chandelier, which was made of Austrian glass and handblown crystal imported from Venice, Italy, weighed 3 tons and was made exclusively for this store when it opened in 1975. Macy's, the new owner of the store, donated 1,500 pieces of the dismantled chandelier to various charitable organizations.

References

External links

 
 Zions Securities Corporation

Buildings and structures in Salt Lake City
Demolished shopping malls in the United States
Deseret Management Corporation
Shopping malls in Utah
Shopping malls established in 1975